Alexis Joel González Belotto (born 7 January 1992) is a Paraguayan footballer who plays as a defensive midfielder for Club Nacional.

Club career
Born in Eusebio Ayala, González joined Cerro Porteño's youth setup in 2008, aged 16. On 28 September 2011 he made his first team debut, starting in a 4–2 away win against General Caballero.

After being regularly used during the 2012 campaign, González fell down the pecking order in the following years. On 15 January 2016, after being strongly linked to Alianza Lima, he joined Sportivo Luqueño on loan until the end of the year.

References

External links

Living people
1992 births
People from Cordillera Department
Paraguayan footballers
Association football midfielders
Paraguayan Primera División players
Cerro Porteño players
Sportivo Luqueño players
Deportivo Capiatá players
Deportivo Santaní players
Club Nacional footballers